Cauliflower revolution is the name of the spontaneous Lithuanian protest started by a dweller of the southwestern Lithuanian town of Vilkaviškis in 2016. She bought the cauliflower at Maxima supermarket in Vilkaviskis, paying €3.49 for one head of cauliflower. She posted the photo on Facebook, and soon tens of thousands of Lithuanians shared the post, making it viral because of various talks on public earlier on rapidly rising prices and a slow growth of salaries compared after the euro was introduced to Lithuania in 2015. A spontaneous three-day boycott occurred, between May 10 and 12, of all four main supermarket chains in Lithuania that control 80% of food distribution in the country, Maxima, Iki, Rimi, and Norfa.

Opinions 

Algirdas Butkevičius, Lithuania’s prime minister, said that most of the goods are imported from nations in the eurozone, and therefore, prices changes are due to reasons such as market challenges, bad harvest and others. , the chief economist at Swedbank said that the escalation in cauliflower prices was caused by a seasonal hike in global demand.

References

2016 in Lithuania
2016 protests
21st-century revolutions
Nonviolent revolutions
Protests in Lithuania
Protests in the European Union
Riots and civil disorder in Lithuania